Treaty of Prairie du Chien may refer to any of four treaties signed in Prairie du Chien, Wisconsin by the United States and Native American peoples of the Upper Midwest:
First Treaty of Prairie du Chien (1825), delimiting borders between the Sioux, Sac and Fox, Menominee, Iowa, Ho-Chunk and the Council of Three Fires
Second Treaty of Prairie du Chien (1829), in which the Council of Three Fires ceded territory to the United States
Third Treaty of Prairie du Chien (1829), in which the Ho-Chunk ceded territory to the United States
Fourth Treaty of Prairie du Chien (1830), in which the Sac and Fox, Sioux, Omaha, Iowa, Otoe and Missouria ceded territory to the United States